Öxnered is a part of Vänersborg in Västra Götalands län in Sweden. It was formerly a separate railway village.

It is located near the E45 road and at the crossing of the Norway/Vänern Line and Älvsborg Line railways. There is a railway station in Öxnered where all passenger trains on both lines stop.

Populated places in Västra Götaland County
Populated places in Vänersborg Municipality